This page list topics related to Croatia.

0-9
 .hr - Internet top-level domain for Croatia
 1667 Dubrovnik earthquake
 1880 Zagreb earthquake
 1898 Trilj earthquake
 1964 Zagreb flood
 1996 Ston–Slano earthquake
 2020 Petrinja earthquake
 2020 Zagreb earthquake

A
Croatian Academy of Sciences and Arts
Accession of Croatia to the European Union
Administrative divisions of Croatia
Croatian Air Force
Architecture of Croatia
Croatian Army
Art of Croatia

B
Croatian National Bank
Banks in Croatia
Croatian brands

C
Cinema of Croatia
Cities in Croatia
Coat of arms of Croatia
Communications in Croatia
Companies of Croatia
Croatian composers
Constitution of Croatia
Counties of Croatia
COVID-19 pandemic in Croatia
Croatia
Croatia and the euro
Croatia and the World Bank
Croatia national football team
Croatia proper
Croatia–Serbia relations
Croats
Croatian cuisine
Culture of Croatia

D
Dalmatia
Date and time notation in Croatia
Demographics of Croatia

E
Economy of Croatia
Education in Croatia
Elections in Croatia
Energy in Croatia
Extreme points of Croatia

F
Flag of Croatia
Flags of Croatia
Foreign relations of Croatia
Free royal cities of Croatia

G
General Staff of the Armed Forces of the Republic of Croatia
Geography of Croatia
Croatian Government

H
Health in Croatia
Highways in Croatia
History of Croatia
Human rights in Croatia

I
Independent State of Croatia
Croatian intelligence community
Croatian interlace
Internet in Croatia
Islands of Croatia
Istria

K
Kingdom of Croatia (Habsburg)
Kingdom of Croatia (medieval)
Kingdom of Yugoslavia
Croatian kuna

L
Croatian language
Law enforcement in Croatia
LGBT rights in Croatia
Lijepa naša domovino
List of Croats
Croatian literature

M
Mammals of Croatia
Military history of Croatia
Military of Croatia
Minefields in Croatia
Mountains in Croatia
Museums in Croatia
Music of Croatia

N
Name of Croatia
National and University Library in Zagreb
Croatian Navy

O
Orders, decorations, and medals of Croatia
Osijek

P
Croatian Parliament
Croatian language poets
Political parties in Croatia
Political prisoners in Croatia
Politics of Croatia
Postal codes in Croatia
Prehistoric Croatia
President of Croatia
Prime Minister of Croatia
Protected areas of Croatia
Public holidays in Croatia

R
Croatian Radiotelevision
Republic of Ragusa
Croatian Railways
Radio stations in Croatia
Religion in Croatia
Rijeka
Rivers of Croatia

S
Schools in Croatia
Slavonia
Socialist Republic of Croatia
Split
Sport in Croatia
State of Slovenes, Croats and Serbs

T
Telecommunications in Croatia
Television in Croatia
Timeline of Croatian history
Tourism in Croatia
Transport in Croatia
Treaty of Accession 2011

U
University of Pula
University of Split
University of Zadar
University of Zagreb

W
Croatian War of Independence
Croatian wine
Women in Croatia
Croatian writers

Y
Yugoslav People's Liberation War
Yugoslavia

Z
Zagreb Cathedral
Zagreb Stock Exchange
Zagreb

See also
Lists of country-related topics - similar lists for other countries
List of cities in Croatia
List of Croats
List of earthquakes in Croatia

Croatia